Toneheim Folk High School is a folk high school located in Hamar, Norway, which focuses on music.

During the 1994 Winter Olympics, it was part of the Hamar Olympic Subsite Village.

Alumni 
 1973-74: Hans Fredrik Jacobsen, musician (Risør)
 1974-75: Jan Kåre Hystad, musician (Stord)
 1975-76: Geir Løvold, musician
 1976-77: Tone Hulbækmo, musician (Tolga)
 1976-77: Hege Schøyen, artist (Oslo)
 1976-78: Olav Dale, saxophone (Voss)
 1977-78: Bjørn Klakegg, guitarist (Skien)
 1979-80: Vilde Bjerke, actor and artist
 1979-80: Eldar Vågan, artist
 1979-80: Ole Jacob Hystad, musician 
 1979-80: Nils Petter Molvær, trumpeter (Langevåg)
 1979-80: Tore Brunborg, saxophonist (Trondheim)
 1980-81: Magne Fremmerlid, vocals
 1982-84: Ragnar Rasmussen, organist
 1982-83: Per Arne Glorvigen, musician (Dovre)
 1983-84: Harald Devold, saxophonist (Vadsø)
 1983-84: Kåre Kolve, saxophonist (Voss)
 1984-85: Geir Lysne, musician (Trondheim)
 1984-85: Helge Sunde, musician (Stryn)
 1985-86: Ragnar Rasmussen, choir director
 1985-86: Jarle Vespestad, drummer (Jessheim)
 1985-86: Hildegunn Øiseth, vocals (Kongsvinger)
 1986-87: Petter Wettre, saxophonist (Sandefjord)
 1988-89: David Gald, musician (Stryn)
 1988-89: Susanne Lundeng, fiddler (Bodø)
 1988-89: Per Mathisen, double bassist (Sandefjord)
 1990-91: Rein Alexander Hauge Korshamn, artist (Bergen)
 1992-93: Maja Ratkje, musician (Trondheim)
 1993-94: Hild Sofie Tafjord, musician (Langevåg)
 1993-94: Kåre Nymark, musician (Langevåg)
 1993-94: Kaia Huuse, musician (Hedmark)
 1993-94: Line Horntveth, musician (Tønsberg)
 1994-95: John Erik Kaada, musician
 1995-96: Unni Løvlid, musician (Hornindal)
 1995-96: Jon Øystein Flink, author (Fredrikstad)
 1996-97: Ole Jørn Myklebust, musician (Eidsdal)
 1997-98: Morten Qvenild, pianist (Kongsberg)
 1998-99: Mathias Eick, trumpeter (Eidsfoss)
 1998-99: Tora Augestad, actor and artist (Bergen)
 1999-00: Erlend Bratlie, saxophone (Stavanger)
 2000-01: Erlend Tvinnereim, vocals (Bergen)
 2000-01: Ingrid Vetlesen, vocals (Oslo)
 2004-05: Espen Wensaas, mandolinist and guitarist (Geilo)
 2006-07: Harald Lassen, saxophonist (Greipstad)
 2006-07: Christian Meaas Svendsen, bassist (Kongsberg)
 2008-09: Elisabeth Wulfsberg, vocalist
 2009-10: Karoline Kalleberg, alto vocalist (Oslo)
 2009-10: Astrid Nordstad, Mezzo-soprano (Trondheim)
 2009-10: Stefi Martine Ringen, vocalist (Oppegård)
 2009-10: Per Myrstad Kringen, pianist (Kristiansand)
 2011-12: Lukas Zabulionis, saxophonist (Sandefjord)
 2012-13: Rohey Taalah, vocals (Oslo)

References

Folk high schools in Norway
Education in Hamar
1972 establishments in Norway
Educational institutions established in 1972